Isaiah Scott may refer to:

 Isaiah Benjamin Scott, American clergyman
 Swerve Strickland, American professional wrestler formerly known as Isaiah "Swerve" Scott